Achim Bellmann (born 27 July 1957) is a German modern pentathlete. He competed for West Germany at the 1984 Summer Olympics.

References

External links
 

1957 births
Living people
German male modern pentathletes
Olympic modern pentathletes of West Germany
Modern pentathletes at the 1984 Summer Olympics
Sportspeople from Münster